Kigeli wa III Ndabarasa, also known as Gitakwandira, (reigned 1708 – 1741) was a Mwami of the Kingdom of Rwanda during the eighteenth century. The end of his reign and the accession of his successor Mibambwe III Mutabazi II Sentabyo was marked by an eclipse.

References

18th-century monarchs in Africa
Rwandan kings